DFCC can refer to:

DFCC Bank, Sri Lanka 
Ouahigouya Airport, Burkina Faso
Dublin Film Critics' Circle, Ireland
Dedicated Freight Corridor Corporation of India, India